Kangtoap Padevat (Revolutionary Army) was a Khmer language weekly newspaper in Cambodia, published in the 1980s. The first issue appeared in December 1979. Kongtoap Padevat was the organ of the Kampuchean People's Revolutionary Armed Forces.

References

Khmer-language newspapers
People's Republic of Kampuchea
Newspapers established in 1979
Military newspapers
Newspapers published in Cambodia
1979 establishments in Cambodia